Dhushantha Ranatunga (born 8 November 1991) is a Sri Lankan former first-class cricketer who played for Ragama Cricket Club. He made his Twenty20 debut on 17 August 2004, for Ragama Cricket Club in the 2004 SLC Twenty20 Tournament.

References

External links
 

1991 births
Living people
Sri Lankan cricketers
Ragama Cricket Club cricketers
People from Negombo